The Floridablanca Ministry was a Spanish government that served between 1777 and 1792 during the reigns of Charles III of Spain and Charles IV of Spain. It was headed by the Count of Floridablanca, a prominent reformer, who sought to press on with the program of reforms initiated by his predecessor Grimaldi.

One of the pillars of Floridablanca's beliefs was that friendly relations with Britain were crucial for the general improvement of Spain. It was considered ironic that in 1779 Spain, at the urging of the King, entered the American War of Independence on France's side, declaring war in Britain. 

Despite his reluctance, Floriblanca took much of the credit for the war, as a Spanish force took advantage of the overstretched British Navy and took several of their colonies in the Caribbean and Gulf of Mexico. In the peace treaty that followed, Spain was awarded Minorca and Florida which had been lost to the British earlier in the century.

The war strengthened the governments position during the 1780s, and they pressed ahead with many reforms. A new threat to power began to emerge in the form of Manuel Godoy, a royal favourite and a Francophile, who grew increasingly influential. Following the outbreak of the French Revolution the reforming liberalism of Floridablanca and his followers rapidly fell out of fashion, and he was dismissed to make way for Godoy in 1792.

Bibliography
 Hughes, Robert. Goya. Vintage, 2004.
 Simms, Brendan. Three Victories and a Defeat: The Rise and Fall of the First British Empire. Penguin Books 2008.

Spanish governments
1777 establishments in Spain
1792 disestablishments in Spain